Samantha Ko Hoi-ling (born January 13, 1987, in Nanjing) is a Chinese born former Miss Hong Kong contestant placing top 5 in the 2008 pageant, actress and model based in Hong Kong.

Being quite tall (高 = tall) compared to her contemporaries, she widely goes by the nickname "Ko-ling", (高寧) a shortened version of her full name.

Filmography

Television dramas

Films 
72 Tenants of Prosperity (2010)
Perfect Wedding (2010)
Beauty on Duty! (2010)
I Love Hong Kong (2011)
Delete My Love (2014)
From Vegas to Macau II (2015)
Never Too Late (2017)
The Sexy Guys (2019)

References

External links
TVB Official Blog
Weibo Blog

TVB actors
1987 births
Living people
Hong Kong female models
21st-century Hong Kong actresses
Hong Kong film actresses
Hong Kong television actresses